Gammarellidae is a family of amphipods containing three genera:
Austroregia J. L. Barnard, 1989
Chosroes Stebbing, 1888
Gammarellus  Herbst, 1793

References

Gammaridea
Crustacean families